The Electoral district of County of Durham was an electorate of the New South Wales Legislative Council at a time when some of its members were elected and the balance were appointed by the Governor. It was named after Durham County, which lies on the north side of the Hunter River.

It was created by the 1843 Electoral Districts Act and initially returned one member. It returned two members with the expansion of the Council in 1851 to 54, 18 to be appointed and 36 elected. In 1856 the unicameral Legislative Council was abolished and replaced with an elected Legislative Assembly and an appointed Legislative Council. The district was represented by the Legislative Assembly electorate of Durham

Members

Election results

1843

1848 by-election
Richard Windeyer died in December 1847.

1848

1849 by-election
On 26 July 1848, the day prescribed for nominations, Stuart Donaldson and Andrew Lang were nominated. A show of hands was in favour of Donaldson and Lang demanded a poll. The returning officer had neglected to make any preparations for a poll and so declared Donaldson elected. Donaldson attempted to resign on 16 August. The election was declared void by the court of disputed returns and a new writ issued.

1851

1853 by-election
Stuart Donaldson resigned in January 1853.

See also
Members of the New South Wales Legislative Council, 1843–1851 and 1851-1856

References

External links
Hansard NSW Legislative Council

Former electoral districts of New South Wales Legislative Council
1843 establishments in Australia
1856 disestablishments in Australia